is a Japanese manga series written and illustrated by Kamome Shirahama. It has been serialized in Kodansha's seinen manga magazine Monthly Morning Two since July 2016, with its chapters collected into eleven tankōbon volumes as of October 2022. An anime adaptation has been announced. A spinoff series, Witch Hat Kitchen, started in November 2019 and has five volumes as of October 2022.

The series follows a girl named Coco, who dreams of being a witch, but in her world only those born with magical abilities are able to become witches. However, after meeting a witch named Qifrey, it seems like there may be hope for Coco after all.

As of October 2022, Witch Hat Atelier had over 4.5 million copies in circulation. In 2020, The series won the Harvey Award for the Best Manga category as well as the Eisner Award for Best U.S. Edition of International Material—Asia.

Plot
Coco is a kind and daydreaming daughter of a dressmaker who aspires to become a witch; however because only innate magical users can practice and use magic, she has to give up on her dream. One day she meets a male witch named Qifrey and after she witnesses how he uses magic (by drawing magical runes and using magical ink), Coco accidentally casts a spell that turns her mother to stone.

As Coco does not know which magic spell she cast and Qifrey is tracking the sinister coven that could be behind the incident, he takes Coco as his apprentice in order to undo the spell and allow her to fulfill her dream. As it is gradually revealed, the coven in question—the Brimmed Caps—have taken an extraordinary interest in Coco, hoping that she will help them revive the free use of magic, which was outlawed because of the atrocities committed with it in past times, with some of their repercussions still enduring in Coco's world. Because rune magic can be effectively made by everyone, the Assembly carefully watches over any abuse of it, even going as so far as to erase the memories of any uninitiated (called "Outsiders") when they discover this secret. Thus, as Coco immerses herself into this new, wondrous world, a sinister plot begins to thicken around her.

Characters

Qifrey's Atelier

A bright, green-haired, optimistic young half-orphan and dressmaker's daughter who dreams of becoming a witch, and sees her wish fulfilled at the horrid cost of her mother getting turned to stone. Subsequently, she is taken in by Qifrey and, instead of having her memory erased, is allowed to learn the ways of rune magic, which gains her a dubious reputation in the magic community. While initially clumsy and naive, she is very enthusiastic about learning all she can about magic, and with her background as an Outsider, she is able to conceive highly creative ways of using her new-found knowledge.

A reclusive witch and magic teacher specializing in water magic. His atelier is a haven for child witches who are considered outcasts because they did not—or refused to—fit into the rigid structures of the old established schools. While it is partly out of kindness that he takes Coco in, he has also taken note of the Brimmed Caps' designs on her. In fact, he holds a very personal grudge against the Brimmed Caps ever since his childhood, where they used him in a fell ritual that took away his right eye (which he now keeps covered by his hair) and the memory of his former life. As a result of their attempts to prevent him from tracking his tormentors, he distanced himself from the Assembly, returning only for necessities. In his pursuit for vengeance, Qifrey is ruthless enough to employ forbidden mind control magic to prevent any hindrance.

A black-haired girl from the renowned Arklaum family, one of the houses who established the vow to keep the magic arts a secret to the general populace. Agott was cast out during her test for apprenticeship when malicious rumors surfaced that the magic she was to present at her trial was someone else's. Upon becoming Qifrey's student, she became a bitter loner, obsessed with perfecting her magic skills under her own power, and distanced herself from the other students. Still, her precision in drawing rune circles makes her very popular with her schoolmates, who often approach her for help or advice.
Upon first meeting Coco, Agott initially treats her with scorn, even sending her off to a demanding test even though Coco had no practical experience with magic yet. However, owing to Coco's sincerity and imagination in devising new ways of employing magic, Agott gradually comes out of her shell and begins regarding Coco as a dear friend and equal, even though she is still reluctant to openly confess her feelings.

A bright, bubbly and constantly upbeat girl with pink curly hair. Her greatest desire is to make people happy with her magic.

A gloomy, distant-looking young girl with long azure hair and a stubborn personality who is skilled in crystal magic and specialized in drawing very small rune circles. She became withdrawn when her beloved older brother Riliphin was the only person to appreciate her magic, and since refused to learn any new magic or submit to authority. Under Coco's encouragement and a magical test where she and her friends were imperilled by the Brimmed Caps, she decided to move on and learn more magic to help her friends.

A blackhaired witch living as a partner and supervisor for the Assembly (a "Watchful Eye") at Qifrey's atelier. Despite his gruff demeanor, he is actually a caring soul, and the magical items he creates are commonly meant to increase the comfort of their users. He specializes in magic creating fire, light and heat. He is from Ghodrey, City of Magic in the north.

A fluffy caterpillar-like creature who attaches itself to Coco during her test for apprenticeship (mainly due to his species' love for the smell of magical inks) and henceforth resides at Qifrey's atelier as a pet. It is frequently hinted that he has an intelligence and persona as complex as a human's.

Brimmed Caps

A high-ranking member—and possibly the leader—of the Brimmed Caps, who characteristically wears a cone hat with a face mask shaped like an eye. Iguin is the one who gave Coco the spellbook which ultimately became responsible for turning her mother into stone, and it is hinted that he sees a potential in her which would allow the reintroduction of magic into everyday life.

A Brimmed Cap who experimented with transformation magic which failed, giving him a feline appearance. In order to hide this, and to intimidate his victims, he has taken to remote-control an empty cloak and hat to impersonate his presence, leading to his nickname "Empty Cloak Witch".

An adolescent Brimmed Cap apprentice disguised as a regular witch, and Restys' student.

A Brimmed Cap witch who converses with his apprentice Ininia through her staff.

The Witches' Assembly
The Witches' Assembly is the institution in Coco's world which governs the use of magic, its spreading (by regulating the enlistment and advancement of apprentices) and the maintenance of its secrecy. The seat of the Assembly is located in an underwater city called the Great Hall, which can only be reached by a certain stairwell descending into the depths of the earth, as well as special magic. This community is financed by the Five Kingdoms of the Zozah Peninsula, in exchange for freely serving the people in times of great need. However, the Assembly is endeavoring to remain neutral in the realms' politics.

A dark-skinned senior witch and one of Qifrey's best friends, even after he left the Assembly to strike out on his own.

Known by the title "Wise in Teachings", Beldaruit is a high mage and member of the Three Wise Ones, the Assembly's ruling council. He is disabled, utilizes a walking chair for locomotion, and likes to cloak his presence with illusions. His playful and seemingly scatter-brained personality hide a sharp intellect. He was once Qifrey's teacher and thus knows about his faults, and has offered to teach Coco to keep her out of her tutor's plotting against the Brimmed Caps.

The current Wise in Principles. Founder and leader of the Knights Moralis.

The new Wise in Friendships, the High Council's diplomat and successor of the previous sage Engendale after the latter's disgrace.

A friendly and caring witch physician residing in the Great Hall. Because any magic directly applied to a living body—including healing magic—is considered forbidden lore, she is limited to using conventional healing methods to treat her patients.

A disparaging, irresponsible sorcerer and Euini's former mentor.

Richeh's older brother and currently Beldaruit's assistant.

Agott's mother and Chief Librarian in the Tower of Tomes, the Assembly's main magical library.

Galga's lover, who later takes him in as his apprentice after Galga has had his memories erased.

A dark-skinned male witch who hero-worships Olruggio.

Hiehart's dark-skinned, sassy young witch apprentice.

A young witch apprentice and a former peer of Agott who is deeply jealous of her talents.

The Knights Moralis
Its members are assigned to track any abuse of magic and hunt down perpetrators and victims for memory erasure.

The stern, dispassionate, by-the-book field captain of the Knight Moralis.

A leading member of the Knights Moralis, who is quietly stern but—contrary to some of her colleagues—moderate-minded. When she was young, Luluci and her best friend Eryenne were victims of a sexual assault by a local lord, which was brushed off by her mentor, who was friends with the offender and was later arrested for it by the Assembly, prompting her to join the Knights. The sight of others getting similarly abused is the only thing which can break down her usually serene facade.

A brash, easy-going member of the Knights Moralis. He is from Ghodrey, City of Magic in the north, like Olruggio.

A member of the Knights Moralis, and Atwert's lover. Appearing aloof, he is really a quiet and simple man. He had his mind wiped permanently by Ininia and was about to be exiled by the Wise Ones to a solitary island called Adanlee, whereupon Atwert takes him in as his apprentice to care for him.
  
Twin juvenile Knight apprentices who have yet to take their profession seriously.

Others

An eldery maker of magical stationery (pens and inks) residing in the town of Kalhn.

Nolnoa's young assistant in the shop. He suffers from silverwash, a rare sight condition which makes him effectively colorblind and thus initially unable to use magic because certain effects rely on inks differentiated by their color. After Coco helps him by teaching him magic with which to circumvent his disability, he begins forming a crush on her.

A nervous young witch apprentice, and originally Kukrow's student. During an advancement test in which some of Qifrey's students were also participating, he is kidnapped by the Brimmed Caps, who etch a magical sigil into his skin, permanently turning him into a scaled wolf. However, with the help of Coco, Agott and Richeh, he receives a talisman which reverses the transformation while worn. Because his tattoo makes him eligible for mind erasure by the Knights Moralis—despite his victimization—he has gone underground with Alaira, who has become his new tutor. He has also formed a bond with Richeh, which has become her primary motivation to expand her studies in order to help him.

A young minstrel who had his legs permanently disabled in an accident that Coco and Agott rescued him from. He has come to befriend Tartah, and wished to learn all he can about apothecary from him in order to restore his legs. However, Ininia tells him a partial truth about the true nature of witches' magic, making him join the Brimmed Caps and turning him against Coco and Tartah.

A wandering minstrel and Custas' foster father. He originally died, but was bestowed with a Time Reversal Tattoo which reset his life and memories.

The head of the royal family and the sovereign ruler of the Zozah Peninsula.

The king's young son and heir to the throne, who adores magic but, due to his social rank, is forbidden from getting into closer contact with it. He keeps a black Brushbuddy as a pet.

The matriarch of the Ezrest royal family.

An elderly male witch and the former Wise in Friendships who was apprehended by the Knights Moralis for his illicit use of magic for personal profit. Instead of having his memory erased, he was imprisoned by the Witches' Assembly.

Media

Manga
Written and illustrated by Kamome Shirahama, Witch Hat Atelier started in Kodansha's seinen manga magazine  on July 22, 2016. Kodansha has compiled its chapters into individual tankōbon volumes. The first volume was published on January 23, 2017. As of October 21, 2022, eleven volumes have been published.

In North America, Kodansha USA announced the acquisition of the series in July 2018. The first volume was published on April 9, 2019.

A spin-off series titled , written and illustrated by Hiromi Satō, began in Monthly Morning Two on November 22, 2019. The first tankōbon volume was published on May 22, 2020. As of October 21, 2022, five volumes have been released.

During their panel at Anime NYC 2022, Kodansha USA announced that they licensed Witch Hat Kitchen for a Fall 2023 release.

Volume list

Witch Hat Atelier

Witch Hat Kitchen

Anime
In April 2022, it was announced that the series will receive an anime adaptation.

Reception
The manga had over 700,000 copies in circulation in July 2018; 1 million by September 2018; 2.5 million by April 2022; and 4.5 million copies in circulation as of October 2022. The series ranked 6th on Kono Manga ga Sugoi!s top 20 manga for male readers 2018. The manga was nominated for the 11th Manga Taishō awards in 2018. Witch Hat Atelier ranked 1st on the "Nationwide Bookstore Employees' Recommended Comics" by the Honya Club website in 2018. The manga was nominated for the 42nd and 44th Kodansha Manga Award in the General category in 2018 and 2020 respectively. It was nominated for the French 12th ACBD's Prix Asie de la Critique 2018.

In 2019, Witch Hat Atelier won the Korean Ridibooks Comic Award 2019' Next Manga Award. The series has won three French awards: the "Daruma d'or manga" at the Japan Expo Awards 2019; the 2019 Mangawa Prize for best seinen manga; and the Babelio 2020 award in the manga category. It won the 24th Spanish Manga Barcelona award for the seinen category in 2018. The series was also picked as a nominee for "Best Youth Comic" at the 46th Angoulême International Comics Festival held in 2019. Witch Hat Atelier was chosen as one of the Best Manga at the Comic-Con International Best & Worst Manga of 2019.

In 2020, Witch Hat Atelier was one of the manga titles that ranked on the "Top 10 Graphic Novels for Teens" by the Young Adult Library Services Association (YALSA) of the American Library Association and ranked again on the 2021 list. Along with Taiyō Matsumoto's Cats of the Louvre, the series won the 2020 Eisner Award for Best U.S. Edition of International Material in the Asia category for Kodansha USA's English release. In 2020, the series won the Harvey Awards for the Best Manga category.

Rebecca Silverman of Anime News Network rated the first two volumes an "A−". Silverman praised the series for its world, story, characters and artwork, and concluded that "this is one tale you don't want to miss".
Writing for Barnes & Noble, Kelly Chiu listed the series on her list of "The Perfect Manga Matches for 10 Studio Ghibli Movies", and recommended the series to fans of Studio Ghibli's Spirited Away.

References

External links
 

Anime series based on manga
Fantasy anime and manga
Harvey Award winners
Kodansha manga
Seinen manga
Witchcraft in anime and manga
Witchcraft in written fiction